Ngangom Ronald Singh (born 4 February 1997) is an Indian professional footballer who plays as a forward for Gokulam Kerala in the I-League.

Career
Born in Manipur, Singh began his career with NEROCA when they were in the I-League 2nd Division. He was part of the NEROCA side that earned promotion from the 2nd Division during the 2016–17 season.

On 9 December 2017, Singh made his professional debut with NEROCA in the I-League against Gokulam Kerala. He came on as an 87th-minute substitute and proceeded to score NEROCA's third goal in the 96th minute as the club won the match 3–0. In NEROCA's next match, on 15 December, Singh would again come off the bench and score. He came on as a 77th-minute substitute during their match against Chennai City and then scored the winning goal two minutes into stoppage time to give NEROCA a 2–1 victory.

Career statistics

Honours
NEROCA
I-League 2nd Division: 2016–17

Gokulam Kerala
I-League: 2020–21, 2021–22

References

1997 births
Living people
People from Manipur
Indian footballers
NEROCA FC players
Association football forwards
Footballers from Manipur
I-League 2nd Division players
I-League players
Gokulam Kerala FC players